Rubén Oscar Wolkowyski (born September 30, 1973) is an Argentine former professional basketball player, who also holds Polish citizenship.

Professional career
Wolkowyski played professionally in Argentina, the United States, Russia, Poland, Spain, and Greece. In 2000, he and Pepe Sánchez became the first Argentines to play in the NBA regular season. Wolkowyski played a total of 41 NBA games and averaged 2 points and 1.1 rebounds per game. His final game being on Christmas of 2002 in a 81 - 117 loss to the New Jersey Nets where he recorded 1 assist, 1 turnover and no other stats in 6 and half minutes of playing time.

On September 29, 2010, Wolkowyski scored 45 points for Libertad de Sunchales in a 118–115 victory over Obras Sanitarias, for the Copa Argentina title. The winner of the game was decided after 4 over-times.

National team career
Wolkowyski defended Argentina to claim the inaugural gold medal at the 1995 Pan American Games in the defeat in the final of the United States, in Mar del Plata, Argentina. 
He defended Argentina in the win at the 2001 Tournament of the Americas, and at the 2003 FIBA Americas Championships, the 2002 and 2006 FIBA World Championships, and for the gold medal at the 1996 and 2004 Summer Olympics.

Personal life
He played in Russia as a European player, rather than as an Argentine, after Wolkowyski obtained Polish citizenship. through his Warsaw-born grandfather, Anatol, who left Poland before World War II, to Argentina via Paraguay. His family spoke Polish at home, but he does not know the language and communicates only in Spanish and English.

References

External links
NBA.com Profile
Euroleague.net Profile
ACB.com Profile 
Latinbasket.com Profile
Hoops Hype Profile

Wolkowyski Profile on Baloncestistas 

1973 births
Living people
1998 FIBA World Championship players
2002 FIBA World Championship players
2006 FIBA World Championship players
Argentine expatriate basketball people in Greece
Argentine expatriate basketball people in Italy
Argentine expatriate basketball people in Puerto Rico
Argentine expatriate basketball people in Russia
Argentine expatriate basketball people in Spain
Argentine expatriate basketball people in the United States
Argentine expatriate basketball people in Uruguay
Argentine men's basketball players
Argentine people of Polish descent
Asseco Gdynia players
Atléticos de San Germán players
Basketball players at the 1995 Pan American Games
Basketball players at the 1996 Summer Olympics
Basketball players at the 2004 Summer Olympics
BC Khimki players
Boca Juniors basketball players
Boston Celtics players
Centers (basketball)
Club Biguá de Villa Biarritz basketball players
Estudiantes de Olavarría basketball players
Greek Basket League players
La Unión basketball players
Libertad de Sunchales basketball players
Liga ACB players
Medalists at the 1995 Pan American Games
Medalists at the 2004 Summer Olympics
National Basketball Association players from Argentina
Olympiacos B.C. players
Olympic basketball players of Argentina
Olympic gold medalists for Argentina
Olympic medalists in basketball
Pan American Games gold medalists for Argentina
Pan American Games medalists in basketball
PBC CSKA Moscow players
People from Juan José Castelli
Polish men's basketball players
Power forwards (basketball)
Quilmes de Mar del Plata basketball players
Saski Baskonia players
Scafati Basket players
Seattle SuperSonics players
Trefl Sopot players
Undrafted National Basketball Association players
1994 FIBA World Championship players
Sportspeople from Chaco Province